Delambre is a lunar impact crater that lies to the southwest of Mare Tranquillitatis, in the central highland region. To the west is the crater pair of Theon Junior and Theon Senior, the latter being more distant and located to the northwest.

It is 52 kilometers in diameter and 3.5 kilometers in depth. It was named for Jean Baptiste Joseph Delambre, an 18th-century French astronomer.

The rim of Delambre has a terraced interior, with a tiny craterlet lying along the northern rim. In the south is a low cut forming a slight notch. The crater interior has an irregular surface. It has high walls, with some peaks reaching 15,000 feet. Delambre was photographed by the unmanned probe Ranger 8 on its descent towards Mare Tranquillitatis.  Delambre is from the Upper Imbrian epoch, which lasted from 3.8 to 3.2 billion years ago.

Satellite craters
By convention these features are identified on lunar maps by placing the letter on the side of the crater midpoint that is closest to Delambre.

References

External links

Delambre at The Moon Wiki
 
  - includes a couple of craters such as Delambre
 

Impact craters on the Moon
Imbrian